"Way Down" is a song recorded by Elvis Presley. Recorded in October 1976, it was his last single released before his death on August 16, 1977. The song was written by Layng Martine Jr. and was later recorded by Presley at his home studio in Graceland on 29 October 1976.

Released as a single (with "Pledging My Love" on the B-side) on June 6, 1977, it was his latest single at the time of his death. It initially peaked at No. 31 on the Billboard Hot 100 chart dated August 6, 1977 and had fallen to No. 53 on the chart for the week ending August 27, 1977.  Thereafter, it reversed direction and reached an even higher peak at No. 18 on 24 September – 1 October 1977.  "Way Down" reached No. 1 on the American Country chart the week he died. The single was certified Platinum in the U.S. by the RIAA in 1999. 

In the UK Singles Chart, after having climbed only four places to number 42 the week before Presley's death, the track rose to number four the following week and then hit the number one in week ending 3 September and stayed there for five weeks. just over seven years after his previous 16th UK number one single, "The Wonder of You", in August 1970.  His previous single, "Moody Blue", had been a number one hit on the US Country Charts earlier in 1977.  "Way Down" was reissued in April 2005 and reached No. 2 on the UK Singles Chart.

The recording also featured J.D. Sumner singing the words "way on down" at the end of each chorus down to the note low C (C2). At the end of the song, this phrase is octaved, reaching a double low C (C1, three octaves below middle C). This note was first accomplished by Sumner in a 1966 recording of the hymn "Blessed Assurance."

Chart performance

Weekly charts

Year-end charts

See also
List of posthumous number-one singles (UK)

References

1977 songs
Elvis Presley songs
1977 singles
European Hot 100 Singles number-one singles
Irish Singles Chart number-one singles
RCA Records singles
Song recordings produced by Felton Jarvis
Songs written by Layng Martine Jr.
UK Singles Chart number-one singles